The Way to Pekin was a Multi-day cycling race that was held in Russia from 2006-2008. It was part of UCI Europe Tour in 2006 and 2007 and UCI Asia Tour in 2008. It was rated as a 2.2 event. It was organized in preparation for the 2008 Summer Olympics in Beijing.

Winners

References

Cycle races in Russia
2006 establishments in Russia
Recurring sporting events established in 2006
UCI Europe Tour races
Defunct cycling races in Russia
Recurring sporting events disestablished in 2008
2008 disestablishments in Russia